HMS Naiad was an  protected cruiser of the Royal Navy which served from 1892 to 1919.

History
In 1890, building by the Naval Construction and Armaments Co, later known as Vickers, commenced.

On 26 Jun 1897, she was present at the Naval Review at Spithead in celebration of the Diamond Jubilee.

Captain Alexander Bethell was appointed in command on 19 March 1901, as she was serving in the Mediterranean Fleet. 
The ship served off South Africa during the Second Boer War (service from April-Nov. 1901) and 117 of her crew of 234 served in Naval Brigades ashore, in the Cape Colony.

The following year she visited Alexandria and Port Said en route for Aden in late October 1902.

Based in the Indian Sea, she was involved in the military operations in Somaliland 1902–04, her crew receiving 285 medals and clasps for the campaign.

In 1910, like many other ships of her class, Naiad was converted to a minelayer, as she was obsolete as a Cruiser. She was relegated to harbour duties in 1919 and sold for scrap in 1922.

References

Publications

External links
 
HMS Naiad at the Dreadnought project.

 

Apollo-class cruisers
Ships built in Barrow-in-Furness
1890 ships
World War I cruisers of the United Kingdom